Nu Kappa Epsilon is a music sorority which, according to its charter, was established to "promote the growth and development of musical activities and appreciation on campus and in the community where chapters have been formed and to develop in the members the best qualities of character through music." Founded in 1994 at the College of William & Mary, each NKE chapter supports its own music-related philanthropy.

History 

Alpha chapter

Nu Kappa Epsilon was founded on August 25, 1994 at the College of William & Mary. Although NKE is not a social sorority nor connected to any professional music organizations, it considers itself a sisterhood, providing a place for women with a love for music to connect. Each NKE chapter supports its own philanthropy and promotes the use of music to "improve and empower day-to-day life." The sorority flower is the white rose, and its colors are hunter green and burgundy.

Founding Sisters of Nu Kappa Epsilon: 
President: Anne Steinbach, '97
Vice President: Laura Fejfar, '95
Secretary: Liz Shiflett, '96
Treasurer: Susanna Smith, '96
Rush Chair: Heather Carter, '96
Historian: Alison Armstrong, '97
Social Chair: Erin Jones, '97
Liaison: Kristi Ramey, '98
Publicity: Kelley Bartell, '97
Sister: Shannon Ashley '98
Sister: Sarah Balcom '98
Sister: Holly Collins '96
Sister: Brenda Herrold '95
Sister: Anne Marks '98
Sister: Leanna McCoy '95
Sister: Shannon Mully '98
Sister: Karen Supetran '97
Sister: Tina Tennenhaus '96
Sister: Chisty Wright '96
Sister: Kristen Yates '97

Beta chapter

Since its founding at the College of William & Mary, a Beta chapter was installed on March 14, 2005 at Christopher Newport University in Newport News, Virginia. Annually, NKE Beta hosts an Open Mic Night, retreats, Rose Ball formal, and events for Out of the Darkness, Playing for Change Foundation and Relay for Life. Philanthropies are chosen which incorporate the values of a love for music and sisterhood. NKE also serves Christopher Newport University and the local community through fundraising events and other volunteer opportunities. NKE Beta chapter's main philanthropy is the Playing for Change Foundation.

Beta chapter's Founding Sisters: 
Jillian (Smetts) Woycik 
Becky (Andrews) Maxey, '08
Katie Lamp, '08
Sara Warrick, '06

Gamma chapter

A Gamma chapter of Nu Kappa Epsilon was installed at Virginia Polytechnic Institute and State University, popularly known as Virginia Tech, on March 28, 2015. NKE Gamma sisters participate in a multitude of groups around campus, including Relay for Life, the New River Valley Symphony, varsity sports and many more. NKE Gamma chapter's main philanthropy is the Songs for Kids Foundation. Since becoming their own chapter, Gamma has gone inactive.

Gamma chapter's Founding Sisters:
Rachel Orris 
Maha Slamani
Corinne von Schmidt-Pauli
Blair Retnauer 
Abigail Wright 
Brianna Childress
Evie Gillis 
Murphy Boales 
Jessica Cotton 
Caroline Moore 
Claire Gagnon

Delta Chapter

A Delta chapter of Nu Kappa Epsilon was installed at Cornell University on September 6, 2020.  After being a colony for a year, they initiated their Alpha class, and became an official chapter.

Delta Chapter's Founding Sisters:
Julia Ludwig
Deniz Tekant
Samhita Pendyal
Marinna Chung
Joo hyun Lee
Victoria Correa
Mallory Azziz
Grace Gu
Hayley Tessler
Elizabeth Klosky
Skiva Wang

Purpose 
According to its charter, "Nu Kappa Epsilon was established to promote the growth and development of musical activities and appreciation on campus and in the community where chapters have been formed and to develop in the members the best qualities of character through music."

Philanthropy 
Nu Kappa Epsilon aims to support the community through both music and time. This includes but is not limited to participating in Relay for Life, Dance Marathon, and ushering at musical performances. Every chapter of Nu Kappa Epsilon has the opportunity to choose their own philanthropy to support, as long as it is music-related. The various chapters currently raise funds and awareness for organizations which include, but are not limited to: the Out of the Darkness Walk, Guitars Not Guns, Relay for Life, Letters for Soldiers, and the Songs for Kids Foundation.

Expansion 
Since its founding in 1994, NKE has established three subsequent chapters.

The Vice President of Nu Kappa Epsilon's founding, Alpha chapter is responsible for the Nationals budget, which may be used for a NKE conference or for expansion activities. Female students with an interest in music at any accredited college or university are eligible to found a chapter of Nu Kappa Epsilon, in conjunction with Nationals at the College of William & Mary.

Connection to Sigma Alpha Iota 
Nu Kappa Epsilon was founded in an attempt to garner attention from the International Music Fraternity for Women, Sigma Alpha Iota (SAI). However, upon being offered colony status by SAI, NKE officers made the decision that the transition would involve the loss of sisters who did not meet certain music class requirements of SAI. In an effort to maintain its founding purpose and inclusiveness, NKE chose to remain separate from SAI.

Notable Alumnae 
Jill Twiss, Alpha chapter, 1998 - Jill graduated from the College of William & Mary in 1998. She is a member of a writing team for Last Week Tonight with John Oliver which won the Primetime Emmy Award for Outstanding Writing for a Variety Series in 2015-2016.

References 
 http://www.nukappaepsilonmusicsorority.blogs.wm.edu/
 http://www.nkecnu.com
 https://www.linkedin.com/in/nkebeta

Fraternities and sororities in the United States
Student organizations established in 1994
College of William & Mary
Christopher Newport University
Virginia Tech
1994 establishments in Virginia